Gump House is a historic home located near Garrett in Keyser Township, DeKalb County, Indiana.  It was built about 1854, and is a two-story, five bay, Greek Revival-style frame dwelling. It has Doric order corner pilasters and a wide frieze.

It was added to the National Register of Historic Places in 1983.

References

Houses on the National Register of Historic Places in Indiana
Greek Revival houses in Indiana
Houses completed in 1854
Houses in DeKalb County, Indiana
National Register of Historic Places in DeKalb County, Indiana